Þórarinn Hugleikur Dagsson, nicknamed Hulli, born 5 October 1977 is an Icelandic artist. He received a B.A. degree from the Iceland Academy of the Arts in 2002.

He was a film critic in a popular Icelandic radio program on Radíó X and hosted another program called Hugleikur on the same station. Hugleikur is known for all kinds of visual and video art. He is most famous for his satirical comics filled with black humor, which have been published as books and in The Reykjavik Grapevine Magazine.

Hugleikur has written three stage plays. The first Forðist okkur (Avoid us), is based on one of his books. It is a story about three dysfunctional families. The second, Leg (Uterus), is a musical about teenage pregnancy in the near future of Iceland. "Baðstofan" (Living Room) his third play, is a dark vision of Iceland in the 18th century. All plays received rave reviews and Hugleikur received "the playwright of the year" award for Forðist okkur.

In 2006 Penguin Books published Should You Be Laughing at This?, which is a collection of cartoons previously published as Forðist okkur (Avoid us) by JPV books in Iceland. Is This Supposed to be Funny?, the second cartoon book, was published by Penguin Books in October 2007. The third book, Is This Some Kind of joke?, was published in 2008.

Bibliography

Stage plays 
 Forðist okkur (English: Avoid Us), 2006
 Leg (English: Uterus, the musical), 2007
 Baðstofan (English: Living room), 2008

Comic books 
 Elskið okkur (English: Love us) 2002
 Drepið okkur (English: Kill us) 2003
 Ríðið okkur (English: Fuck us) 2004
 Forðist okkur (English: Avoid us). A collection containing, Love, Kill and Fuck Us 2005
 Bjargið okkur (English: Save us) 2005
 Fermið okkur (English: Confirm us) 2006
 Should You Be Laughing at This? The English translation of Forðist okkur, published by Penguin Books 2006
 Fylgið okkur (English: Follow us) 2006
 Eineygði kötturinn Kisi og hnakkarnir (English: Kisi, the one-eyed cat, and the douchebags) 2006
 Ókei bæ! (English: Okay bye!) 2007
 Is This Supposed to Be Funny? The English translation of Bjargið okkur, published by Penguin Books 2007
 Eineygði kötturinn Kisi og Leyndarmálið (English: Kisi, the one-eyed cat, and the Secret) 2007
 Kaupið okkur (English: Buy us) 2007
 Garðarshólmi 2008 (a comic story printed on every page in the Icelandic Telephone Registry)
 Eineygði kötturinn Kisi og Ástandið, fyrri hluti: Annus Horribilis (English: Kisi, the one-eyed cat, and the Situation, part I: Annus Horribilis) 2008
 Ókei bæ tvö (English: Okay bye two) 2008
 Jarðið okkur (English: Bury us) 2008 Is This Some Kind of Joke?, published by Penguin books 2008
 Garðarshólmi, önnur skorpa 2009 (a comic story printed on every page in the Icelandic Telephone Registry)
 Eineygði kötturinn Kisi og Ástandið, seinni hluti: Flóttinn frá Reykjavík (English: Kisi, the one-eyed cat, and the Situation, part II: Escape from Reykjavík) 2009
 Eineygði kötturinn Kisi og leyndardómar Eyjafjallajökuls (English: Kisi, the one-eyed cat, and the mysteries of the Eyjafjallajökull) 2010 (with Pétur Atli Antonsson)

References

External links
Official website

1977 births
Icelandic cartoonists
Hugleikur Dagsson
Living people